Zimbabwean literature is literature produced by authors from Zimbabwe or in the Zimbabwean Diaspora. The tradition of literature starts with a long oral tradition, was influence heavily by western literature during colonial rule, and acts as a form of protest to the government.

Some prominent Zimbabwean writers include Dambudzo Marechera NoViolet Bulawayo, and Stanlake Samkange.

See also 
 List of Zimbabwean writers

References 

Zimbabwean literature